Hermesprota Creek is a  tributary of Darby Creek in Collingdale, Sharon Hill, Darby Township, and Folcroft in Delaware County, Pennsylvania.

Course
Hermesprota Creek begins in the Har Zion Cemetery near the community of Collingdale, Pennsylvania. It flows south-southeast for several tenths of a mile before passing under U.S. Route 13 and turns west and enters Sharon Hill, Pennsylvania. The creek turns south and enters the communities of Darby Township and Folcroft. Hermesprota Creek then enters the John Heinz National Wildlife Refuge and receives two small unnamed tributaries, from the right and left banks respectively. After several hundred feet, it reaches its confluence with Darby Creek.

Hermesprota Creek joins Darby Creek  upriver of its mouth.

Hydrology
The water quality of Hermesprota Creek is poor. High amounts of lead, selenium, and zinc were found in sediment in the creek. Hazardous materials were dumped into the creek from 1953 to the 1970s, when the adjacent Folcroft Landfill was closed. The southern part of the creek is tidally influenced.

Geography and geology

Watershed
The entire creek is in the United States Geological Survey quadrangle of Lansdowne.

History
Hermesprota Creek was entered into the Geographic Names Information System on August 2, 1979. Its identifier in the Geographic Names Information System is 1176873.

Several bridges have been built across Hermesprota Creek. A concrete arch bridge with a length of  carries Folcroft Avenue over the creek and was built in 1925. A 24.9-foot-long concrete slab bridge was built in 1932 and carries Tribbitt Avenue across the creek.

Biology
The drainage basin of Hermesprota Creek is a Coldwater Fishery and a Migratory Fishery. Recreational fishing occurs in the creek. It is in a NOAA habitat of concern.

See also
List of Pennsylvania rivers

References

Rivers of Delaware County, Pennsylvania
Rivers of Pennsylvania
Tributaries of Darby Creek (Pennsylvania)